Shankarpur is one of the administrative divisions of Madhepura district in the Indian state of  Bihar. The block headquarters are located at a distance of 13 km from the district headquarters, namely, Madhepura.

Geography

Panchayats
Panchayats in Shankarpur community development block are: Maura Kabiahi, Maura Jharkaha, Parsha, Rampur Lahi, Gidhdha, Behrari, Sonbarsha, Jirwa Madheli and Raibhir.

Demographics
In the 2001 census Shankarpur Block had a population of 82,519.

References

Community development blocks in Madhepura district